The Xie clan of Chen Commandery was a prominent clan, originating in Chen commandery (modern-day Zhoukou, Henan). First rising to prominence in the Eastern Jin period, they retained their importance throughout the Southern dynasties in the Northern and Southern Dynasties period, along with such clans as the Wang clan of Langya, with which they were often associated as "Wang-Xie".

Prominent Members

 Xie An (320–385), Eastern Jin statesman, overall commander at the Battle of the Fei River
 Xie Wan (320–361), Jin general
 Xie Shang (327–389), Jin general
 Xie Xuan (343–388), Jin general
 Xie Daoyun (340 – after 399), poet and calligrapher, daughter-in-law of Wang Xizhi
 Xie Lingyun (385–433), poet and pioneer of 'mountain-and-water poetry'

References

Chinese clans
Jin dynasty (266–420)